Cuiluan District is a district in the west of Yichun, Heilongjiang province, People's Republic of China.

Administrative divisions
There are two subdistricts in the district:

Subdistricts:
Xiangyang Subdistrict, Shuguang Subdistrict

Transport 
 G1111 Hegang–Harbin Expressway
 China National Highway 222

Notes and references

External links 
  Government site - 

Cuiluan